Columbia TriStar Television, Inc. (abbreviated as CTT) was an American television production and distribution company that was active from 1994 to 2002. It was operated as the third name of the early television studio Screen Gems and the fourth name of Pioneer Telefilms, both part of Sony Pictures Entertainment and the third company to use the Columbia and TriStar names together (the first being Columbia TriStar Home Video, later Sony Pictures Home Entertainment and the second, Columbia TriStar International Television, later rebranded as Sony Pictures Television International).

History

Beginnings
Columbia TriStar Television was launched on February 21, 1994, from the merger of Columbia Pictures Television and TriStar Television, under the leadership of Jon Feltheimer, who was president of TriStar Television from 1991 to 1994 and of New World Television until 1991. After the merger, Columbia Pictures Television Distribution was renamed Columbia TriStar Television Distribution, but the old name continued to appear on-screen until 1995. The new studio entered production after dismantling and folding Merv Griffin Enterprises on June 4, 1994, by producing Jeopardy! and Wheel of Fortune (distributed by King World) starting in September 1994. In 1994, SPE acquired Stewart Television.

Its global subsidiary, Columbia TriStar International Television, distributed Sony's programs globally. It was created in 1992 by merging Columbia Pictures International Television with TriStar Television. The launch of Columbia TriStar Television Group (aka Sony Television Entertainment) came five years later.

On January 30, 1997, it was changed from Sony Television Entertainment to Columbia TriStar Television Group. On March 12, 1997, CTT signed a deal with Procter & Gamble Productions to launch shows that P&G products sponsor, after the original agreement with Paramount Television expired. On August 26, 1997, Addis-Wechsler inked a five-year joint venture agreement with the studio to produce all forms of its own television programming.

On July 1, 2000, Barry Thurston stepped down as president of Columbia TriStar Television Distribution after 17 years and was succeeded by then-current president, Steve Mosko. Thurston was originally president of Embassy Telecommunications in 1983.

On October 25, 2001, Columbia TriStar Network Television shut down. They learned that this path was blocked by Sony thanks to its Japanese ownership, resulting in the loss of 70 various  jobs. On the same day, CTT and CTTD merged to form Columbia TriStar Domestic Television.

End of Columbia TriStar Television 
On September 16, 2002, Sony Pictures Entertainment retired the "Columbia TriStar" name from television and renamed the American studio 
as Sony Pictures Television and its international division as Sony Pictures Television International.

See also
List of Sony Pictures Television programs
Screen Gems
Columbia Pictures Television
TriStar Television
Sony Pictures Television

References

External links 

1994 establishments in California
2002 disestablishments in California
Mass media companies established in 1994
Mass media companies disestablished in 2002
Television production companies of the United States
Television syndication distributors
Predecessors of Sony Pictures Television
Entertainment companies based in California
Sony Pictures Television
Sony subsidiaries